Palaruvi Falls is a waterfall located in Kollam district in the Indian state of Kerala. It is the 32nd highest waterfall in India.

See also
 Kumbhavurutty Waterfall
 Manalar Waterfall
 Oliyarik Waterfall
 List of waterfalls in India
 List of waterfalls in India by height

References

External links

Kallada River
Waterfalls of Kollam district